IncludeOS is a minimal, open source, unikernel operating system for cloud services and IoT. IncludeOS allows users to run C++ applications in the cloud without any operating system. IncludeOS adds operating system functionality to an application allowing oneself to create a 'virtual machine' for an application.

IncludeOS applications boot in tens of milliseconds and require only a few megabytes of disk and memory.

Architecture
The minimalist architecture of IncludeOS means that it does not have any virtual memory space. In turn, therefore, there is no concept of system calls nor user space.

References

External links
 IncludeOS on GitHub
 IncludeOS blog
 Alfred Bratterud: Deconstructing the OS: The devil’s In the side effects, CppCon 2017 presentation
 C++ Weekly – Ep 31 – IncludeOS

Computing platforms
Free software operating systems
Software using the Apache license
Software companies of Norway
Free software programmed in C++